Lectionary 161, designated by siglum ℓ 161 (in the Gregory-Aland numbering) is a Greek manuscript of the New Testament, on paper leaves. Paleographically it has been assigned to the 16th century. 
Formerly it was labelled as Lectionary 39a.

Description 

The codex contains weekday Apostolos lessons (Acts and Epistles) from Easter to Pentecost and Saturday/Sunday Gospel lessons for the other weeks lectionary (Apostolarion),
on 115 paper leaves (21.5 cm by 16 cm). It is written in Greek minuscule letters, in one column per page, 24 lines per page.

History 

The manuscript is not cited in the critical editions of the Greek New Testament (UBS3).

Currently the codex is located in the Biblioteca Vallicelliana (C. 46, fol. 227–341) at Rome.

See also 

 List of New Testament lectionaries
 Biblical manuscript
 Textual criticism

Notes and references 

Greek New Testament lectionaries
16th-century biblical manuscripts